The Honda NX650 Dominator is a dual-sport motorcycle. It was manufactured by Honda from 1988 to 2003.

Design 
Its engine is slightly larger than that of the XR600R, which debuted in 1985. The 97 x 80 mm bore engine was enlarged to 100 mm and stroked to 82mm for 644cc. With 44 horsepower at 6,000 rpm, the engine had 53 N⋅m of torque at 5,000 rpm. A gear-driven counterbalancing system helps to smooth out vibrations created by the large single-cylinder engine. The compression ratio of 8.3:1 for the four valves is aided by a single chain-driven overhead camshaft. The intake is via a 40 mm Keihin constant-velocity carburettor, reaching as low as 5.2 L/100km (45 mpg) from 12.8 liters (3.4 gallons) in the tank.  The bike features a dry-sump (frame carries oil supply) engine. 

The Dominator has a dual exhaust located alongside the rear fender and its powertrain is a wet clutch powering a five-speed gearbox.

The non-adjustable fork has 41mm tubes and supplies 8.5 inches of travel; the rake is 28.5 degrees, and the trail is 4.5 inches. A fork brace is built into the underside of the fender. The front carries a 21-inch spoked wheel with a 90/90 tire. The motorcycle has a single front disc brake with a twin-piston caliper.  

In the back, the single-shock setup allows for preload alterations, with rear-wheel travel at 7.5 inches. The rear carries a 17-inch spoked wheel with a 120/90 tire. The rear wheel features a disc brake. The footpegs have rubber inserts, intended to appeal to urban riders. If a rider was interested in more off-road use, the inserts could be punched out, leaving saw-toothed metal pegs, which are useful in precarious situations.

Sales 
United States' sales of the NX650 were disappointing and it was withdrawn from the US market after only two years in 1990. The European version sold well and was marketed through 2003.

Variants 
Other variations of the NX650 included the NX125, NX150, NX200, NX250, NX350, NX400, and NX500.

References

External links 

 Honda NX650 Dominator Review, Motorcycle Network. Retrieved 2021-06-19
NX650 Dominator
Dual-sport motorcycles
Motorcycles introduced in 1988